Andigné is a former commune in the Maine-et-Loire department in western France. On 1 January 2016, it was merged into the commune of Le Lion-d'Angers.

Geography
The river Oudon forms all of the commune's northern border.

Population

See also
Communes of the Maine-et-Loire department

References

Former communes of Maine-et-Loire